Siechenbach is a small river in Beckum, North Rhine-Westphalia, Germany. It is a left tributary of the Kollenbach, the upper course of the Werse.

See also
List of rivers of North Rhine-Westphalia

References

Rivers of North Rhine-Westphalia
Rivers of Germany